Paracantha trinotata is a species of tephritid or fruit flies in the genus Paracantha of the family Tephritidae.

Distribution
Mexico, Guatemala.

References

Tephritinae
Insects described in 1978
Diptera of North America